Fabrice Jean Andre Aurieng (born 7 December 1981 in Sainte-Clotilde) is a French Savate kickboxer.

Titles
Kickboxing
Professional
2015 NDC K-1 rules heavyweight +100 kg Champion
2015 ISKA European K-1 Rules Champion
2011 K-1 Kick Tournament in Marseille Tournament Champion
2010 K-1 Kick Tournament in Marseille Tournament Champion 
2009 K-1 Kick Tournament in Marseille Tournament Champion
Amateur
2004 French Champion
2003 French Champion
2001, 2002, 2003 La Réunion Champion
Savate
2009 2013 World Champion
2008, 2010 European Champion
2008, 2009, 2010, 2013 2016 French Champion Elite
2007 Vice-champion of France
2005 French Champion Honneur
Boxing 
Professional - 11 wins, 8 losses
2013 World Boxing Federation International heavyweight Champion
2013 Wins vacant Universal Boxing Organization (UBO) World heavyweight Champion
2013 French Heavyweight Champion
2012 Universal Boxing Organization (UBO) InterContinental Heavyweight Champion
Amateur
2007 Island Games Champion
2007 Elite France Semi Finalist
2007 champion d’Aquitaine

Kickboxing record

|-  bgcolor="#fbb"
| 2023-02-04 || Loss ||align=left| Michal Turynski  || Boxing Fighters System Event 3 || Nimes, France || KO || 3 || 
|-
! style=background:white colspan=9 |

|-  bgcolor="#FFBBBB"
| 2022-12-03 || Loss ||align=left| Michal Turynski  ||  Run Fight Trophy|| Saint-Pierre, Réunion || TKO (Doctor stoppage) || 3 || 
|-
! style=background:white colspan=9 |
|-
|-  bgcolor="#FFBBBB"
| 2018-11-24|| Loss ||align=left| Thomas Vanneste  ||Nuit Des Champions || France || Decision || 3 || 3:00
|-
|- bgcolor="#CCFFCC"
| 2018-09-22 || Win ||align=left|  Othmane Hacine || Le Trophée Des Etoiles  || Aix-en-Provence, France || Decision  ||  3 || 3:00
|-  bgcolor="#FFBBBB"
| 2017-11-24|| Loss ||align=left| Mikhail Tyuterev  ||-95kg KFWC savate pro Semi Finals || France || KO (Straight Right) || 1 ||
|-
|-  bgcolor="#FFBBBB"
| 2017-06-30 || Loss ||align=left| Roman Kryklia  || Monte Carlo Fighting Masters || Monte Carlo, Monaco || TKO (Towel Thrown) || 2 || 
|-
! style=background:white colspan=9 |
|- 
|-  style="background:#c5d2ea;"
| 2016-11-19 || NC ||align=left| Ondřej Hutník || Nuit des Champions 2016 || Marseille, France || No contest || 4 ||
|-
! style=background:white colspan=9 | 
|-
|- bgcolor="#CCFFCC"
| 2016-05-19 || Win ||align=left| Frank Muñoz || Capital Fights  || Paris, France || Decision  ||  3 || 3:00
|-
|-  bgcolor="#CCFFCC"
| 2016-03-06 || Win ||align=left| Luca Panto || MFC4  || France ||Decision  || 3 || 3:00
|-
|- bgcolor="#CCFFCC"
| 2015-11-14 || Win ||align=left| Mladen Brestovac || La 22ème Nuit Des Champions || Marseille, France || Decision || 5 || 3:00
|-
! style=background:white colspan=9 |
|-
|- bgcolor="#CCFFCC"
| 2015-09-12 || Win ||align=left| Miroslav Stverak || Battle of Saint-Raphael 3 || Saint-Raphaël, France || Decision || 3 || 3:00
|-
|-  bgcolor="#CCFFCC"
| 2015-08-04 || Win ||align=left| Yuksel Ayaydin || Fight Night Saint-Tropez  || Saint Tropez, France || Decision || 4 || 2:00
|-
|- bgcolor="#CCFFCC"
| 2015-02-21 || Win ||align=left| Nordine Mahieddine|| Stars Night || Vitrolles, France || TKO || 3 || 
|-
! style="background:white" colspan=9 | 
|-
|- bgcolor="#CCFFCC"
| 2014-06-07 || Win ||align=left| Mamadou Keta || Gala du Phenix Muaythai 6 || Trets, France || TKO (Corner Stop.) ||  || 
|-
|-  bgcolor="#FFBBBB"
| 2012-11-09 || Loss ||align=left| Abdarhmane Coulibaly || Maxi Fight 4 || Saint-Denis, Réunion || Decision || 3 || 3:00
|-
|- bgcolor="#CCFFCC"
| 2011-10-15 || Win ||align=left| German Talbot || TK2 World Max 2011: Fight Code Final 8 || Marseille, France || Decision || 3 || 3:00
|-
|-
|- bgcolor="#CCFFCC"
| 2011-05-27 || Win ||align=left| Nicolas Wamba || K-1 Kick Tournament in Marseille, Final || Marseille, France || Decision || 3 || 3:00
|-
! style=background:white colspan=9 |
|- bgcolor="#CCFFCC"
| 2011-05-27 || Win ||align=left| Nordine Mahieddine || K-1 Kick Tournament in Marseille, Semi Finals || Marseille, France || Decision || 3 ||3:00
|-
|- bgcolor="#CCFFCC"
| 2011-04-30 || Win ||align=left| Eric Nosa || Run Fight Trophy || France || KO || 3 ||
|-
|-  bgcolor="#FFBBBB"
| 2010-01-29 || Loss ||align=left| Nicolas Wamba || K-1 Kick Tournament in Marseille, Final || Marseille, France || Decision || 3 || 3:00
|-
! style=background:white colspan=9 |
|- bgcolor="#CCFFCC"
| 2010-01-29 || Win ||align=left| Goncalo Salvado || K-1 Kick Tournament in Marseille, Semi Finals || Marseille, France || Decision || 3 ||3:00
|-
|-  bgcolor="#c5d2ea"
| 2009-12-18 || Draw ||align=left| Grégory Tony || Trophée Bad Panther || Stade Michel Volnay, Réunion || Decision Draw || 5 || 3:00
|-
! style=background:white colspan=9 |
|-
|- bgcolor="#CCFFCC"
| 2009-02-06 || Win ||align=left| Damian Garcia || K-1 Kick Tournament in Marseille, Final || Marseille, France || KO ||  ||
|-
! style=background:white colspan=9 |
|- bgcolor="#CCFFCC"
| 2009-02-06 || Win ||align=left| Frank Muñoz || K-1 Kick Tournament in Marseille, Semi Finals || Marseille, France || Decision || 3 ||3:00
|-
|-  bgcolor="#FFBBBB"
| 2007-10-12 || Loss ||align=left| Patrice Quarteron || A-1 World Combat Cup || Ankara, Turkey || KO (Knee strike) || 1 || 
|-
|-
| colspan=9 | Legend:

Professional boxing record

See also
List of male kickboxers

References

1981 births
Living people
French male kickboxers
Heavyweight kickboxers
French savateurs
French male boxers